Ch'iyar Qullu (Aymara ch'iyara black, qullu mountain, "black mountain", also spelled Chiar Kkollu) is a volcanic centre in Bolivia. It is located in the Oruro Department, Ladislao Cabrera Province, Salinas de Garci Mendoza Municipality, northeast of Salinas de Garci Mendoza, near a maar named Jayu Quta ("salt lake").

It is a sill formed from primitive phyric alkali basalt that closely resembles ocean island basalt in composition and now appears as a hill. The rocks contain augite and olivine and the eruption site coincides with a local lineament and is of Miocene age, with dates of 22.51±0.45 mya by Ar-Ar dating and 25.2±0.5 mya by K-Ar dating. The Ch'iyar Qullu magmas are Central Andes intraplate magmas and originate from the upper mantle.

References 

Volcanoes of Bolivia
Volcanoes of Oruro Department
Geology of Oruro Department
Sills (geology)
Miocene volcanism